"Pie" is a song by American rapper Future, featuring American singer Chris Brown. It was released on June 25, 2017, as the second single from Future's sixth studio album, Hndrxx (2017). The song was written by Future and Brown along with its producers, Detail and D. A. Doman.

Background
Initially, "Pie" was not included on HNDRXX, but later Future decided to add it on to an updated version of the album, as the 18th track. Future announced the song at the BET Awards when he was asked about new music.

Music video
The music video was uploaded to Future's Vevo channel on YouTube on June 25, 2017, along with the song's release. Directed by Nick Walker, the video features Future and Brown "hang[ing] out on a tennis court, chilling by a swimming pool and ordering takeaway at a fancy mansion party."

Track listing

Charts

Certifications

Release history

References

2017 songs
2017 singles
Future (rapper) songs
Songs written by Future (rapper)
Song recordings produced by Detail (record producer)
Songs written by Detail (record producer)
Songs written by Chris Brown
Epic Records singles
Songs written by D.A. Got That Dope